Kreuder is a German surname. 
Notable people with the surname include:

Ernst Kreuder (1903  1972), German author
Peter Kreuder (1905 – 1981), German-Austrian pianist, composer and conductor

See also

Kräuter, Kreuter, Kreutter, Kreuther, Greuter

German-language surnames